The Tomb of Darius II are Catacomb located in Marvdasht.This tomb is part of the Naqsh-e Rostam.

Gallery

Sources

Naqsh-e Rustam
Tourist attractions in Fars Province
Mausoleums in Iran
Buildings and structures in Fars Province
Achaemenid architecture